The following is a list of notable people associated with the University of Alabama, located in the American city of Tuscaloosa, Alabama.

Notable alumni

Art and humanities

Business

Entertainment

Politics and government

Journalism and literature

Science and technology

Sports

Basketball 
 Richard Hendrix, professional basketball player

Active NBA players 
 JaMychal Green, Los Angeles Clippers
 Collin Sexton, Cleveland Cavaliers
 Kira Lewis Jr., New Orleans Pelicans
 Donta Hall, Brooklyn Nets
 Herbert Jones, New Orleans Pelicans

Active international league players

 Retin Obasohan (born 1993), basketball player for Hapoel Jerusalem of the Israeli Basketball Premier League
 Levi Randolph (born 1992), basketball player for Hapoel Jerusalem of the Israeli Basketball Premier League

Retired NBA players

WNBA players 
 Dominique Canty, Detroit Shock, 29th pick overall, 1999

Football

Active NFL players

Former NFL players

Retired CFL players

 Trevis Smith, Saskatchewan

Pro Football Hall of Fame

NFL coaches

College football coaches

Softball
 Kelly Kretschman, USA Olympic softball player 2004–08
Brittany Rogers, 4-time collegiate All-American
Charlotte Morgan, Softball Coach; first pick in the 2010 National Pro Fastpitch Senior Draft

Baseball

Golf

Gymnastics
 Terin Humphrey, United States Olympian (2004 Athens), silver medalist in team competition

Swimming & diving

Tennis
 Juan Carlos Bianchi, tennis professional and Venezuelan Olympian; played on the Venezuela Davis Cup team and represented Venezuela at the 1996 Summer Olympics in Atlanta
 Ellis Ferreira, tennis professional and Olympian; represented South Africa at the 1996 Summer Olympics in Atlanta; once ranked no. 1 Association of Tennis Professionals doubles player in the world

Track & field

Other
 Eryk Anders, former Crimson Tide linebacker; professional Mixed Martial Artist, current UFC Middleweight
Desi Barmore (born 1960), American-Israeli basketball player

Notable faculty

References

Lists of people by university or college in Alabama